Barzin Dan (also Romanized as Barzīn Dan) is a village in Zaboli Rural District, in the Central District of Mehrestan County, Sistan and Baluchestan Province, Iran. At the 2006 census, its population was 145, in 29 families.

References 

Populated places in Mehrestan County